Holoaerenica is a genus of beetles in the family Cerambycidae, containing the following species:

 Holoaerenica alveolata Martins, 1984
 Holoaerenica apleta Galileo & Martins, 1987
 Holoaerenica bistriata Lane, 1973
 Holoaerenica multipunctata (Lepeletier & Aud-Serv in Latreille, 1825)
 Holoaerenica obtusipennis (Fuchs, 1963)
 Holoaerenica punctata (Gilmour, 1962)

References

Aerenicini